The 2021 New Mexico United season was the third season for New Mexico United in the USL Championship, the second-tier professional soccer league in the United States. This article covers the period from November 1, 2020, the day after the cancellation of the 2020 USL playoff final, to the conclusion of the 2021 USL playoff final. The USL Championship 2021 season began on April 24, and New Mexico United played its first competitive match of the season on May 1.

Season in review

Off-season and pre-season 
The club concluded the 2020 season with a loss to El Paso Locomotive FC in the Western Conference semifinal. They ended the regular season in 2nd place in Group C.

Six players departed in November after the conclusion of play. Romeo Parkes returned to Sligo Rovers at the end of his loan. Chris Wehan and Saalih Muhammed transferred to Orange County SC and Oakland Roots SC, respectively. Ryan Williams and David Estrada announced their retirements from professional football, and Joris Ahlinvi was released at the end of his contract. December saw Ilija Ilić, Harry Swartz, and Sergio Rivas join from Indy Eleven, Hartford Athletic, and Reno 1868 FC, respectively.

In January 2021, the club announced the signings of Isidro Martinez from Rio Grande Valley FC Toros and semiprofessional defender Alex Touche. February saw two players depart the club, Ben Beaury and Sammy Sergi; and two new signings, Micheal Azira and Brian Brown.

In March, first-choice goalkeeper Cody Mizell announced he would be departing New Mexico United for a club in Major League Soccer, later revealed to be New York City FC. Later that month, on March 11 the club announced the signing of Alex Tambakis from North Carolina FC, where he had been first-choice for the prior three seasons.

May 
New Mexico United began its competitive season away at Rio Grande Valley FC Toros on May 1, beginning the campaign with a 1–0 loss. One week later, Devon Sandoval scored the first goal of the season in an eventual 1–1 draw away at El Paso Locomotive FC. The club won its first competitive game of the season on May 15 against Austin Bold FC, in their first game at home since the end of the 2019 USL Championship season. Later that month, New Mexico United beat Colorado Springs Switchbacks FC 3–1, winning the first competitive match at the Switchbacks' new stadium. They ended the month with a 1–0 loss at home to Atlantic Division opponents Loudoun United FC, in which Austin Yearwood was sent off with a straight red card in the 23rd minute.

June 
After an away win over Real Monarchs on June 4, the club played Austin Bold FC to a scoreless draw at home on June 12. The club announced contract extensions for both vice-captain Kalen Ryden and attacking midfielder Amando Moreno, both of whom signed deals through 2023. After beating San Antonio FC at home on June 16, the club ended the month with two away losses to Four Corners Cup teams in 5 days. Colorado Springs Switchbacks FC won 3–1 on June 25, and Real Monarchs won 3–2 on June 30.

July 
New Mexico United lost their first game of the month 1–2 away at El Paso Locomotive FC on July 3. Despite leading in the first half, Dylan Mares scored two goals 105 seconds apart. This was the first time the club had lost 3 consecutive league matches. Returning home, on July 9 they beat Colorado Springs Switchbacks 3–1, with two goals after the end of regulation time. On July 12, they won a second consecutive match at home, beating Charleston Battery 2–1. Nine days later, they lost to San Antonio FC 3–0, making a streak of 7 matches in which the home side won. Returning home on July 24, the club played El Paso Locomotive FC to a scoreless draw. On July 28, the club announced the re-signing of Afghan international David Najem, who had left New Mexico United after making 13 appearances in the 2020 season.

August 
On August 1, New Mexico United drew 0–0 away at Tacoma Defiance. Returning home on August 14, the club drew El Paso Locomotive FC 1-1. On August 17, the club announced the return of Chris Wehan, who had transferred to Orange County SC. Also on August 17, the Albuquerque City Council approved a ballot measure to finance construction of a soccer-specific stadium by gross tax receipt bonds. The measure will appear on the ballot of the 2021 Albuquerque mayoral election. The next day, the club announced the signing of trialist goalkeeper Will Palmquist, who had previously played for the University of Denver. On August 18, the club drew its fourth game in a row, playing Oakland Roots SC to a 1-1 result. The club finished the month with a draw away at Austin Bold FC and a 3–2 loss to Phoenix Rising FC.

September 
New Mexico United began September with a 3–2 win at home over Colorado Springs Switchbacks FC on September 4. Near the end of that match, Switchbacks player Michee Ngalina was sent off after forcefully throwing a soccer ball toward a ball boy behind one of the goals. Ngalina was fined and suspended for 2 matches following the incident. After a loss away to Austin Bold FC, the club won its three remaining matches that month at home to Real Monarchs, away at San Antonio FC, and at home to Rio Grande Valley FC Toros.

October 
The club lost the first of its 7 matches in October away at Louisville City FC, losing 3-1 as their captain Paolo DelPiccolo scored twice in the opening 15 minutes. They then drew 2-2 a home to Hartford Athletic on October 6, in their third and final match against Eastern Conference opposition in the regular season. Three days later, on October 9 they again drew at home, playing Rio Grande Valley FC Toros to a 1–1 draw. The club drew their third game in a row October 17 away to San Diego Loyal SC, which saw them move into 4th place. In the penultimate home match of the regular season, New Mexico United beat San Antonio FC 4–2. Chris Wehan scored a brace, just his third for the club and his first since July 31, 2019. Despite winning their final game of the season 3–1 at home to Real Monarchs, other results left the club 5th in the Mountain Division, and out of the USL Championship playoffs.

November 
On November 5, after the conclusion of New Mexico United's season, the club announced the departure of head coach Troy Lesesne. Lesesne, who had coached the team since their inaugural 2019 season, chose not to renew his contract.

Club roster

Transfers out

Loans Out

Transfers in

Loans In

Competitions

Exhibition 
On March 1, United announced 6 preseason friendlies; three of which will be held in Albuquerque, and 3 of which will be held away.

USL Championship 
On January 21, the USL Board of Governors announced the format for the 2021 season, which would divide the Eastern and Western Conferences into two smaller divisions. Teams will play 32 regular season matches, playing a quadruple round-robin schedule against teams in their division, and playing other opponents to reach 32 games played. On March 2, the final division alignment was released, placing New Mexico United into the Mountain Division, alongside Austin Bold FC, Colorado Springs Switchbacks FC, El Paso Locomotive FC, Real Monarchs, RGV FC Toros, and San Antonio FC. As the only division with 7 teams instead of 8, the Mountain Division will play 24 regular season matches against division opponents, and 8 against regional or cross-conference opponents.

Group table 
Mountain Division

Results summary

Results by matchday

Matches 

Home team is listed first, left to right.

Kickoff times are in MDT (UTC-06) unless shown otherwise

U.S. Open Cup 
After cancelling the 2020 U.S. Open Cup due to the COVID-19 pandemic in the United States, on February 9 the United States Soccer Federation announced an abbreviated format for the 2021 edition, limiting the field of participants to 24 clubs. Originally, 8 spots were reserved for the USL Championship, with 24 of 31 teams eligible to compete. However, on March 29, the tournament was further abbreviated to include 16 teams. The 4 2020 USL Conference finalists were confirmed to participate, so New Mexico United will not play the 2021 U.S. Open Cup.

Statistics

Outfield players

Goalkeepers

Notes

References 

New Mexico United
New Mexico
New Mexico
New Mexico United